Victor Yakovlevich Pan is a Soviet and American mathematician and computer scientist, known for his research on algorithms for polynomials and matrix multiplication.

Education and career
Pan earned his Ph.D. at Moscow University in 1964, under the supervision of Anatoli Georgievich Vitushkin, and continued his work at the Soviet Academy of Sciences. During that time, he published a number of significant papers and became known informally as "polynomial Pan" for his pioneering work in the area of polynomial computations. In late 1970s, he immigrated to the United States and held positions at several institutions including IBM Research. Since 1988, he has taught at Lehman College of the City University of New York.

Contributions
Victor Pan is an expert in computational complexity and has developed a number of new algorithms. One of his notable early results is a proof that the number of multiplications in Horner's method is optimal.

In the theory of matrix multiplication algorithms, Pan in 1978 published an algorithm with running time . This was the first improvement over the Strassen algorithm after nearly a decade, and kicked off a long line of improvements in fast matrix multiplication that later included the Coppersmith–Winograd algorithm and subsequent developments. He wrote the text How to Multiply Matrices Faster (Springer, 1984) surveying early developments in this area. His 1982 algorithm still held the record in 2020 for the fastest "practically useful" matrix multiplication algorithm (i.e., with a small base size and manageable hidden constants). In 1998, with his student Xiaohan Huang, Pan showed that matrix multiplication algorithms can take advantage of rectangular matrices with unbalanced aspect ratios, multiplying them more quickly than the time bounds one would obtain using square matrix multiplication algorithms.

Since that work, Pan has returned to symbolic and numeric computation and to an earlier theme of his research, computations with polynomials. He developed fast algorithms for the numerical computation of polynomial roots,
and, with Bernard Mourrain, algorithms for multivariate polynomials based on their relations to structured matrices.
He also authored or co-authored several more books, on matrix and polynomial computation,
structured matrices, and on
numerical root-finding procedures.

Recognition
Pan was appointed Distinguished Professor at Lehman College in 2000.

In 2013 he became a fellow of the American Mathematical Society, for "contributions to the mathematical theory of computation".

Selected publications

Research papers

Books

References

External links

Profile in American Scientist

Year of birth missing (living people)
Living people
20th-century American mathematicians
21st-century American mathematicians
American computer scientists
Soviet emigrants to the United States
Soviet mathematicians
Soviet computer scientists
Theoretical computer scientists
Fellows of the American Mathematical Society
Lehman College faculty